CDN may refer to:

Places
 Canada (Canadian), a North American country
 , a neighborhood in Montreal, Quebec, Canada

Technology
 Content delivery network, on the Internet
 Change detection and notification, of Web pages

Transportation
 Canadian Airlines (former ICAO Airline code), a defunct airline
  (CdN), a former French railway system
 Coulsdon Town railway station, London, National Rail station code
 Croydon railway station, Melbourne (station code), a railway station in Melbourne, Victoria, Australia

Organizations

 Centro Dramático Nacional, the national theatre of Spain
 Cooperation and Development Network Eastern Europe, a network of green political and environmental youth organisations from Eastern Europe
 , a French bank
 Cartel Del Noreste, a faction of the Los Zetas drug cartel of Mexico.

Media
 Central Daily News, a Chinese-language newspaper formerly owned by the Kuomintang
 , a former underground printing house
 Chicago Daily News, a defunct American newspaper

Entertainment
CDN television, a Dominican Republic television network